John Stuart Agnew (born 30 August 1949) is a British farmer and politician who served as Member of the European Parliament (MEP) for the East of England region for the UK Independence Party (UKIP) from 2009 to 2019.

Early life and career 
Agnew was born in Norwich, and educated at Gordonstoun School and the Royal Agricultural College. During the 1970s he worked in Rhodesia as a soil conservation officer, as well as being a reserve in the Rhodesian Army. A long-time UKIP member, he is a Norfolk farmer who formerly represented Norfolk on the NFU Council.

Political career 
He sits on the European Parliament Committee on Agriculture and Rural Development.

He was the UKIP candidate in Mid Norfolk at the 2001 general election, in Norfolk North at the 2005 general election, and in Broadland at the 2010 and 2015 general elections.

As UKIP's Shadow Secretary of State for Environment, Food and Rural Affairs, Agnew has described climate change science as "the global warming scam". In the European Parliament in 2015, he stated that plants need carbon dioxide as food, so "if you succeed in decarbonising Europe, our crops will have no natural gas to grow from". Richard A. Betts of the Met Office described this as a misunderstanding, since cutting emissions did not mean reducing existing levels of carbon dioxide in the atmosphere.

In the 2017 UKIP leadership election, he was the running-mate of Anne Marie Waters.

In April 2019, Agnew was appointed Deputy Leader of UKIP in the European Parliament following the resignation of Ray Finch, and it was reported that he spoke to the Springbok Club.

Agnew lost his seat at the 2019 European Parliament election, when UKIP dropped to seventh position with 3.42% of the regional vote.

References

1949 births
Living people
People educated at Gordonstoun
Alumni of the Royal Agricultural University
UK Independence Party parliamentary candidates
UK Independence Party MEPs
MEPs for England 2009–2014
MEPs for England 2014–2019
20th-century English farmers
Politicians from Norwich
British Eurosceptics
21st-century English farmers